Stelis interrupta is a species of leafcutter, mason, and resin bees in the family Megachilidae. It is found in North America.

References

Further reading

 
 
 
 

Megachilidae
Insects described in 1897